Ectadiosoma is a genus of moths of the family Crambidae. It contains only one species, Ectadiosoma straminea, which is found in Australia, where it has been recorded from Queensland.

References

Spilomelinae
Monotypic moth genera
Moths of Australia
Crambidae genera
Taxa named by Alfred Jefferis Turner